Pseudotephritis ussurica is a species of ulidiid or picture-winged fly in the genus Pseudotephritis of the family Ulidiidae.

Distribution
Russian Far East.

References

Ulidiidae
Insects described in 1997
Diptera of Asia